The following is the list of railways in Croatia as defined by the Government of Croatia in 2014. The classification groups the railways into three groups — the railways of international, regional and local significance.

Classification of railways significance 
Railways for international traffic are:

 main (corridor) lines, which are located on international railway corridors and their branches (corridors RH1, RH2 and RH3)

 other lines for international traffic, which within railway hubs and outside them functionally connect the main (corridor) lines or which international sea and river ports and terminals connect with the main (corridor) lines

Railways for regional traffic are lines that in terms of long-distance transport connect:

 railway transport regions in the Republic of Croatia

 railway transport regions in the Republic of Croatia with railways for international traffic

 railway transport regions of neighboring countries with railway transport regions in the Republic of Croatia or with railway lines for international traffic in the Republic of Croatia

Railways for local traffic are:

 railways which connect ports and terminals of non-international importance, as well as industrial zones and economic operators with railways of importance for regional traffic

 railways which, within a particular railway transport region, in terms of local traffic, interconnect certain areas or administrative-economic centers, or connect them to railways for international traffic or to railways for regional traffic

 railways in the function of urban and suburban railways, if at the same time they are not railways for international traffic or railways for regional traffic

 railways which, in terms of local traffic, connect certain local areas in the Republic of Croatia with local areas of neighboring countries

 railways for local connection within railway hubs

Railways of international significance

Railways of regional significance

Railways of local significance

Notes

References

!
Croatia